JS Hamana (AOE-424) is the third ship of the s of the Japanese Maritime Self-Defense Force. She was commissioned on 29 March 1990.

Construction and career
She is laid down on 8 July 1988 and launched on 18 May 1989. Commissioned on 29 March 1990 with the hull number AOE-424. 

On 19 February 2021, USS Curtis Wilbur and French frigate Prairial conducted a replenishment with JS Hamana.

On 21 May 2022, the Hamana, the JS Makinami (DD-112), and the JS Asahi (DD-119) sighted the PLAN Liaoning carrier strike group going towards Miyako-jima.

Gallery

References

External links

Ships of the Japan Maritime Self-Defense Force
Ships built by Hitachi Zosen Corporation
1989 ships
Towada-class replenishment ships